The 2021–22 South Carolina Gamecocks men's basketball team represented the University of South Carolina during the 2021–22 NCAA Division I men's basketball season. The team was led by 10th-year head coach Frank Martin, and played their home games at Colonial Life Arena in Columbia, South Carolina as a member of the Southeastern Conference. They finished the season 18–13, 9–9 in SEC play to finish in a five-way tie for fifth place. As the No. 7 seed in the SEC tournament, they lost to Mississippi State in the second round.

On March 14, 2022, the school fired head coach Frank Martin. On March 24, the school named Chattanooga head coach Lamont Paris the team's new head coach.

Previous season
In a season limited due to the ongoing COVID-19 pandemic, the Gamecocks finished the 2020–21 season 6–15, 4–12 in SEC play to finish in 12th place. As the No. 11 seed in the SEC tournament they lost in the first round to Ole Miss.

Offseason

Departures

Incoming Transfers

2021 recruiting class

2022 Recruiting class

Roster

Schedule and results

|-
!colspan=12 style=| Exhibition

|-
!colspan=12 style=| Non-conference regular season

|-
!colspan=12 style=| SEC regular season

|-
!colspan=12 style=| SEC tournament

See also
2021–22 South Carolina Gamecocks women's basketball team

References

South Carolina Gamecocks
South Carolina Gamecocks men's basketball seasons
South Carolina Gamecocks
South Carolina Gamecocks